The 2008 Atlanta Braves season was the 43rd in Atlanta and the 138th overall. The Braves attempted to  reclaim a postseason berth for the first time since 2005. They were once again skippered by Bobby Cox, now in his 19th season (of his second stint) managing Atlanta. As a result of John Schuerholz taking the position of team president, the Braves entered the offseason with Frank Wren as their general manager.

The team wore a patch on the right sleeve "BEACH" in honor of former Braves player and bench coach Jim Beauchamp, who had died after the previous season ended. 

2008 saw the departure of two of the team's longtime radio and television announcers. Skip Caray died on August 3, while Pete van Wieren announced his retirement on October 21. Both men had been broadcasting for the team since 1976.

Offseason

October
 October 25: Claimed RHP Chris Resop off waivers from the Los Angeles Angels of Anaheim and designated RHP Chad Paronto for assignment.
 October 29: Acquired OF Gorkys Hernández and RHP Jair Jurrjens from the Detroit Tigers in exchange for SS Édgar Rentería and cash considerations. Sent RHP Chad Paronto outright to Triple-A Richmond. He refused the assignment, becoming a free agent.

November
 November 16: Acquired OF Josh Anderson from the Houston Astros in exchange for RHP Óscar Villarreal.
 November 19: Signed Tom Glavine to a one-year, $8 million contract.
 November 20: Designated INF Pete Orr for assignment. Orr was later released by the organization on November 28.
 November 30: Designated RHP Lance Cormier for assignment.

December
December 4: Acquired LHP Will Ohman and INF Omar Infante from the Chicago Cubs in exchange for RHP José Ascanio.
December 4: Designated OF Willie Harris for assignment. Harris was released and became a free agent on December 12.
December 17: Signed C Javy López to a minor-league contract and an invitation to spring training.

January
January 14: Acquired CF Mark Kotsay from the Oakland Athletics in exchange for RHP Joey Devine and minor league RHP Jamie Richmond.
January 17: Acquired LHP Jeff Ridgway from the Tampa Bay Rays in exchange for utility infielder Willy Aybar and minor league infielder Chase Fontaine.

March
March 22: Javy López announces he will retire after being told he will not make the opening day roster.
March 26: Tyler Yates traded to the Pittsburgh Pirates in exchange for minor league pitcher Todd Redmond.
March 28: Rubén Gotay claimed off of waivers from the New York Mets.
March 31: Scott Spiezio signed to minor league contract. Released April 12.

May
May 5: Acquired utility-man Greg Norton from the Seattle Mariners for cash considerations.

Regular season

Season standings

National League East

Record vs. opponents

Roster

Game log

|-  style="text-align:center; background:#fbb;"
| 1 || March 30 || @ Nationals || 2–3 || Rauch (1–0) || Moylan (0–1) || || 39,389 || 2:22 || 0–1 || ESPN || WGST/WUBL
|-  style="text-align:center; background:#fbb;"
| 2 || March 31 || Pirates || 11–12(12) || Osoria (1–0) || Boyer (0–1) || || 45,269 || 4:28 || 0–2 || WPCH || WGST/WUBL
|-

|-  style="text-align:center; background:#bfb;"
| 3 || April 2 || Pirates || 10–2 || Jurrjens (1–0) || Gorzelanny (0–1) || || 17,893 || 2:57 || 1–2 || FSN South || WGST/WUBL
|-  style="text-align:center; background:#fbb;"
| 4 || April 3 || Pirates || 3–4 (12) || Yates (1–0) || Resop (0–1) || Capps (1) || 19,240 || 3:21 || 1–3 || SportsSouth || WGST/WUBL
|-  style="text-align:center; background:#bbb;"
| — || April 4 || Mets || colspan="6"|Rescheduled for May 20|| 1–3 || colspan="2"|
|-  style="text-align:center; background:#bfb;"
| 6 || April 5 || Mets || 11–5 || Hudson (1–0) || Maine (0–1) || || 36,130 || 3:27 || 2–3 || FOX || WGST/WUBL
|-  style="text-align:center; background:#bfb;"
| 7 || April 6 || Mets || 3–1 || Smoltz (1–0) || Santana (1–1) || Soriano (1) || 39,414 || 2:35 || 3–3 || SportsSouth || WGST/WUBL
|-  style="text-align:center; background:#fbb;"
| 8 || April 7 || @ Rockies || 1–2 || Herges (1–0) || Boyer (0–2) || Corpas (2) || 24,304 || 2:05 || 3–4 || SportsSouth || WGST/WUBL
|-  style="text-align:center; background:#fbb;"
| 9 || April 8 || @ Rockies || 3–4 || Jiménez (1–1) || Jurrjens (1–1) || Corpas (3) || 24,640 || 2:24 || 3–5 || SportsSouth || WGST/WUBL
|-  style="text-align:center; background:#fbb;"
| 10 || April 9 || @ Rockies || 6–12 || Redman (1–1) || James (0–1) || ||  23,210 || 2:44 || 3–6 || FSN South || WGST/WUBL
|-  style="text-align:center; background:#bbb;"
| — || April 10 || @ Rockies || colspan="6"|Rescheduled for June 16|| 3–6 || colspan="2"|
|-  style="text-align:center; background:#bfb;"
| 12 || April 11 || @ Nationals || 3–0 || Hudson (2–0) || Chico (0–2) || Moylan (1) || 28,051 || 2:15 || 4–6 || SportsSouth || WGST/WUBL
|-  style="text-align:center; background:#bfb;"
| 13 || April 12 || @ Nationals || 10–2 || Smoltz (2–0) || Lannan (0–2) || || 32,532 || 2:44 || 5–6 || SportsSouth || WGST/WUBL
|-  style="text-align:center; background:#fbb;"
| 14 || April 13 || @ Nationals || 4–5 || Redding (2–1) || Bennett (0–1) || Rauch (2) || 29,151 || 3:06 || 5–7 || SportsSouth || WGST/WUBL
|-  style="text-align:center; background:#fbb;"
| 15 || April 15 || @ Marlins || 0–4 || Olsen (2–0) || Jurrjens (1–2) || || 10,462 || 2:36 || 5–8 || SportsSouth || WGST/WUBL
|-  style="text-align:center; background:#fbb;"
| 16 || April 16 || @ Marlins || 5–6 || Hendrickson (3–1) || Hudson (2–1) || Gregg (3) || 10,712 || 2:41 || 5–9 || FSN South || WGST/WUBL
|-  style="text-align:center; background:#bfb;"
| 17 || April 17 || @ Marlins || 8–0 || Smoltz (3–0) || Nolasco (1–1) || || 11,237 || 2:53 || 6–9 || SportsSouth || WGST/WUBL
|-  style="text-align:center; background:#bfb;"
| 18 || April 18 || Dodgers || 6–1 || Ohman (1–0) || Lowe (1–1) || || 38,250 || 3:03 || 7–9 || WPCH || WGST/WUBL
|-  style="text-align:center; background:#bfb;"
| 19 || April 19 || Dodgers || 4–1 || James (1–1) || Billingsley (0–3) || Acosta (1) || 40,451 || 2:40 || 8–9 || FOX || WGST/WUBL
|-  style="text-align:center; background:#bfb;"
| 20 || April 20 || Dodgers || 6–1 || Jurrjens (2–2) || Kuroda (1–2) || || 36,772 || 3:11 || 9–9 || SportsSouth || WGST/WUBL
|-  style="text-align:center; background:#bfb;"
| 21 || April 21 || Nationals || 7–3 || Hudson (3–1) || Chico (0–4) || || 16,706 || 2:50 || 10–9 || SportsSouth || WGST/WUBL
|-  style="text-align:center; background:#fbb;"
| 22 || April 22 || Nationals || 0–6 || Lannan (1–2) || Smoltz (3–1) || || 23,482 || 2:48 || 10–10 || SportsSouth || WGST/WUBL
|-  style="text-align:center; background:#fbb;"
| 23 || April 23 || Marlins || 2–7 || Miller (1–2) || Bennett (0–1) || || 19,852 || 3:05 || 10–11 || FSN South || WGST/WUBL
|-  style="text-align:center; background:#bfb;"
| 24 || April 24 || Marlins || 7–4 || James (2–1) || Badenhop (0–2) || Acosta (2) || 19,903 || 2:34 || 11–11 || SportsSouth || WGST/WUBL
|-  style="text-align:center; background:#bfb;"
| 25 || April 25 || @ Mets || 6–3 || Jurrjens (3–2) || Pelfrey (2–1) || || 52,495 || 3:06 || 12–11 || WPCH || WGST/WUBL
|-  style="text-align:center; background:#fbb;"
| 26 || April 26 || @ Mets || 3–4 || Maine (2–2) || Hudson (3–2) || Wagner (5) || 51,339 || 2:56 || 12–12 || SportsSouth || WGST/WUBL
|-  style="text-align:center; background:#fbb;"
| 27 || April 27 || @ Mets || 3–6 || Figueroa (2–1) || Smoltz (3–2) || Wagner (6) || 53,487 || 2:46 || 12–13 || SportsSouth || WGST/WUBL
|-  style="text-align:center; background:#fbb;"
| 28 || April 29 || @ Nationals || 3–6 || Rivera (2–1) || Boyer (0–3) || Rauch (5) || 25,285 || 2:43 || 12–14 || SportsSouth || WGST/WUBL
|-  style="text-align:center; background:#fbb;"
| 29 || April 30 || @ Nationals || 2–3 || Rivera (3–1) || Acosta (0–1) || || 29,473 || 3:17 || 12–15 || SportsSouth || WGST/WUBL
|-

|-  style="text-align:center; background:#bfb;"
| 30 || May 2 || Reds || 2–0 || Hudson (4–2) || Vólquez (4–1) || || 32,057 || 2:21 || 13–15 || WPCH || WGST/WUBL
|-  style="text-align:center; background:#bfb;"
| 31 || May 3 || Reds || 9–1 || Reyes (1–0) || Belisle (1–2) || || 37,969 || 2:58 || 14–15 || WPCH || WGST/WUBL
|-  style="text-align:center; background:#bfb;"
| 32 || May 4 || Reds || 14–7 || Ring (1–0) || Arroyo (1–4) || || 33,750 || 3:16 || 15–15 || SportsSouth || WGST/WUBL
|-  style="text-align:center; background:#bfb;"
| 33 || May 6 || Padres || 5–3 || Jurrjens (4–2) || Young (2–3) || Bennett (1) || 21,657 || 2:42 || 16–15 || SportsSouth || WGST/WUBL
|-  style="text-align:center; background:#bfb;"
| 34 || May 7 || Padres || 5–2 || Hudson (5–2) || Wolf (2–2) || Acosta (2) || 25,194 || 2:22 || 17–15 || FSN South || WGST/WUBL
|-  style="text-align:center; background:#bfb;"
| 35 || May 8 || Padres || 5–4 || Acosta (1–1) || Thatcher (0–4) || || 28,337 || 3:19 || 18–15 || SportsSouth || WGST/WUBL
|-  style="text-align:center; background:#fbb;"
| 36 || May 9 || @ Pirates || 2–3 || Grabow (2–1) || Bennett (0–2)|| || 21,050 || 2:55 || 18–16 || SportsSouth || WGST/WUBL
|-  style="text-align:center; background:#fbb;"
| 37 || May 10 || @ Pirates || 2–5 || Gorzelanny (3–3)|| James (2–2) || Capps (9) || 28,141 || 2:10 || 18–17 || SportsSouth || WGST/WUBL
|-  style="text-align:center; background:#bbb;"
| – || May 11 || @ Pirates || colspan="6"|Rescheduled for May 12|| 18–17 || colspan="2"|
|-  style="text-align:center; background:#fbb;"
| 39 || May 12 || @ Pirates || 0–5 || Duke (2–2) || Jurrjens (4–3) || || || || 18–18 || SportsSouth || WGST/WUBL
|-  style="text-align:center; background:#bfb;"
| 38 || May 12 || @ Pirates || 8–1 || Hudson (6–2) || Van Benschoten (0–1) || || 16,669 || 2:40 || 19–18 || SportsSouth || WGST/WUBL
|-  style="text-align:center; background:#fbb;"
| 40 || May 13 || @ Phillies || 4–5 || Kendrick (3–2) || Reyes (0–1) || Lidge (10) || 44,101 || 2:41 || 19–19 || SportsSouth || WGST/WUBL
|-  style="text-align:center; background:#bfb;"
| 41 || May 14 || @ Phillies || 8–6 || Glavine (1–1) || Myers (2–4)  || Boyer (1) || 36,001 || 2:51 || 20–19 || FSN South || WGST/WUBL
|-  style="text-align:center; background:#fbb;"
| 42 || May 15 || @ Phillies || 0–5 || Hamels (5–3) || James (2–3) || || 34,120 || 2:13 || 20–20 || SportsSouth || WGST/WUBL
|-  style="text-align:center; background:#bfb;"
| 43 || May 16 || Athletics || 3–2 || Acosta (2–1) || Embree (1–2) || || 31,004 || 3:02 || 21–20 || WPCH || WGST/WUBL
|-  style="text-align:center; background:#fbb;"
| 44 || May 17 || Athletics || 4–5 || Harden (2–0) || Hudson (6–3) || || 38,324 || 2:49 || 21–21 || WPCH || WGST/WUBL
|-  style="text-align:center; background:#bfb;"
| 45 || May 18 || Athletics || 5–2 || Reyes (2–1) || Duchscherer (3–3) || || 31,025 || 2:47 || 22–21 || SportsSouth || WGST/WUBL
|-  style="text-align:center; background:#bfb;"
| 5 || May 20 || Mets || 6–1 || Glavine (2–1) || Maine (5–3) || || 26,873 || 2:44 || 23–21 || WPCH || WGST/WUBL
|-  style="text-align:center; background:#bfb;"
| 46 || May 20 || Mets || 6–2 || Campillo (1–0) || Vargas (0–2) || Acosta (3) || 25,590 || 2:30 || 24–21 || SportsSouth || WGST/WUBL
|-  style="text-align:center; background:#bfb;"
| 47 || May 21 || Mets || 11–4 || Jurrjens (5–3)|| Pelfrey (2–5) || || 30,335 || 3:14 || 25–21 || FSN South || WGST/WUBL
|-  style="text-align:center; background:#bfb;"
| 48 || May 22 || Mets || 4–2 || Hudson (7–3) || Santana (5–3) || Ohman (1) || 30,348 || 2:21 || 26–21 || WPCH || WGST/WUBL
|-  style="text-align:center; background:#fbb;"
| 49 || May 23 || D-backs || 1–11 || Davis (2–1) || Reyes (2–2) || || 27,263 || 2:33 || 26–22 || WPCH || WGST/WUBL
|-  style="text-align:center; background:#bfb;"
| 50 || May 24 || D-backs || 3–1 || Boyer (1–3) || Slaten (0–1) || || 36,263 || 2:39 || 27–22 || FOX || WGST/WUBL
|-  style="text-align:center; background:#fbb;"
| 51 || May 25 || D-backs || 3–9 || Owings (6–2) || Glavine (2–2) || || 35,628 || 3:24 || 27–23 || SportsSouth || WGST/WUBL
|-  style="text-align:center; background:#bfb;"
| 52 || May 26 || D-backs || 7–3 || Acosta (3–1) || Webb (9–2) || || 29,635 || 3:07 || 28–23 || SportsSouth || WGST/WUBL
|-  style="text-align:center; background:#fbb;"
| 53 || May 27 || @ Brewers || 2–3 || Torres (4–1) || Bennett (0–3)|| || 28,872 || 2:26 || 28–24 || SportsSouth || WGST/WUBL
|-  style="text-align:center; background:#fbb;"
| 54 || May 28 || @ Brewers || 0–1 || Suppan (3–4) || Reyes (2–3) || Torres (4) || 31,612 || 2:15 || 28–25 || FSN South || WGST/WUBL
|-  style="text-align:center; background:#bfb;"
| 55 || May 29 || @ Brewers || 8–1 || Campillo (2–0) || McClung (2–2) || || 33,334 || 2:56 || 29–25 || SportsSouth || WGST/WUBL
|-  style="text-align:center; background:#fbb;"
| 56 || May 30 || @ Reds || 2–3 (11) || Mercker (1–0) || Ring (1–1) || || 37,015 || 3:07 || 29–26 || SportsSouth || WGST/WUBL
|-  style="text-align:center; background:#fbb;"
| 57 || May 31 || @ Reds || 7–8 (10) || Cordero (2–0) || Acosta (3–2) || || 38,585 || 3:43 || 29–27 || FOX || WGST/WUBL
|-

|-  style="text-align:center; background:#fbb;"
| 58 || June 1 || @ Reds || 2–6 || Cueto (4–5) || Hudson (7–4) || || 35,942 || 2:42 || 29–28 || SportsSouth || WGST/WUBL
|-  style="text-align:center; background:#bfb;"
| 59 || June 2 || Marlins || 7 – 5 (10) || Ohman (2–0) || Kensing (3–1) || || 20,896 || 3:01 || 30–28 || SportsSouth || WGST/WUBL
|-  style="text-align:center; background:#bfb;"
| 60 || June 3 || Marlins || 5–4 || Ohman (3–0) || Lindstrom (1–0) || Soriano (2) || 25,476 || 2:59 || 31–28 || WPCH || WGST/WUBL
|-  style="text-align:center; background:#fbb;"
| 61 || June 4 || Marlins || 4–6 || Miller (2–2) || Acosta (3–3)|| Gregg (11) || 26,917 || 3:00 || 31–29 || WPCH || WGST/WUBL
|- style="text-align:center; background:#bfb;"
| 62 || June 5 || Marlins || 7–5 || Jurrjens (6–3) || Nolasco (5–4) || Soriano (3) || 27,238 || 2:53 || 32–29 || WPCH || WGST/WUBL
|-  style="text-align:center; background:#fbb;"
| 63 || June 6 || Phillies || 3–4 (10) || Gordon (5–2) || Acosta  (3–4) || Lidge (16) || 34,074 || 3:36 || 32–30 || WPCH || WGST/WUBL
|-  style="text-align:center; background:#fbb;"
| 64 || June 7 || Phillies || 2–6 || Romero (4–1) || Reyes (2–4)|| || 43,854 || 3:02 || 32–31 || WPCH || WGST/WUBL
|-  style="text-align:center; background:#fbb;"
| 65 || June 8 || Phillies || 3–6 || C. Durbin (2–1) || Boyer (1–4) || Lidge (17) || 33,370 || 3:09 || 32–32 || SportsSouth || WGST/WUBL
|-  style="text-align:center; background:#fbb;"
| 66 || June 10 || @ Cubs || 5–10 || Lilly (6–5) || Glavine (2–3) || || 41,624 || 2:50 || 32–33 || WPCH || WGST/WUBL
|-  style="text-align:center; background:#fbb;"
| 67 || June 11 || @ Cubs || 2–7 || Dempster (8–2)|| Bennett (0–4) || || 41,497 || 2:25 || 32–34 || FSN South || WGST/WUBL
|-  style="text-align:center; background:#fbb;"
| 68 || June 12 || @ Cubs || 2–3 (11)  || Wood (3–1)  || Acosta (3–5) || || 41,517 || 3:22 || 32–35 || WPCH || WGST/WUBL
|-  style="text-align:center; background:#bfb;"
| 69 || June 13 || @ Angels || 5–2 || Reyes (3–4) || Garland (6–4) || Bennett (2) || 43,919 || 2:17 || 33–35 || SportsSouth || WGST/WUBL
|-  style="text-align:center; background:#bfb;"
| 70 || June 14 || @ Angels || 9–4 || Morton (1–0) || Santana (8–3) || || 43,894 || 3:00 || 34–35 || SportsSouth || WGST/WUBL
|-  style="text-align:center; background:#fbb;"
| 71 || June 15 || @ Angels || 0–2 || Saunders (10–3) || Campillo (2–1) || Rodríguez (28) || 43,723 || 2:14 || 34–36 || ESPN || WGST/WUBL
|-  style="text-align:center; background:#bfb;"
| 11 || June 16 || @ Rockies || 7–1 || Jurrjens (7–3) || Jiménez (1–7) || || 25,120 || 3:02 || 35–36 || SportsSouth || WGST/WUBL
|-  style="text-align:center; background:#fbb;"
| 72 || June 17 || @ Rangers || 5–7 || Padilla (9–3) || Hudson (7–5) || Wilson (14) || 33,558 || 2:40 || 35–37 || WPCH || WGST/WUBL
|-  style="text-align:center; background:#bfb;"
| 73 || June 18 || @ Rangers || 5–2 || Bennett (1–4) || Wilson (0–2) || González (1) || 38,545 || 2:50 || 36–37 || FSN South || WGST/WUBL
|-  style="text-align:center; background:#fbb;"
| 74 || June 19 || @ Rangers || 4–5 || Wright (4–2) || Boyer (1–5) || || 28,853 || 3:04 || 36–38 || WPCH || WGST/WUBL
|-  style="text-align:center; background:#fbb;"
| 75 || June 20 || Mariners || 2–10 || Rowland-Smith (1–1) || Campillo (2–2) || || 40,268 || 2:53 || 36–39 || WPCH || WGST/WUBL
|-  style="text-align:center; background:#bfb;"
| 76 || June 21 || Mariners || 5–4 || Boyer (2–5) || Batista (3–9) || || 47,158 || 3:10 || 37–39 || WPCH || WGST/WUBL
|-  style="text-align:center; background:#bfb;"
| 77 || June 22 || Mariners ||8–3 || Hudson (8–5) || Silva (3–9) || || 30,965 || 2:25 || 38–39 || SportsSouth || WGST/WUBL
|-  style="text-align:center; background:#fbb;"
| 78 || June 23 || Brewers || 1–4 || Sheets (9–1) || Reyes (3–5) || || 25,661 || 2:14 || 38–40 || FSN South || WGST/WUBL
|-  style="text-align:center; background:#fbb;"
| 79 || June 24 || Brewers || 3–4 || Bush (4–7) || Morton (1–1) || Torres (13)|| 29,224 || 2:31 || 38–41 || WPCH || WGST/WUBL
|-  style="text-align:center; background:#bfb;"
| 80 || June 25 || Brewers || 4–2  || Campillo (3–2) || Suppan (4–6) || González (2) || 34,829 || 2:29 || 39–41 || WPCH || WGST/WUBL
|-  style="text-align:center; background:#bfb;"
| 81 || June 27 || @ Blue Jays || 4–0 || Jurrjens (8–3) || McGowan (6–6) || || 24,282 || 2:33 || 40–41 || SportsSouth || WGST/WUBL
|-  style="text-align:center; background:#fbb;"
| 82 || June 28 || @ Blue Jays || 5–9 || Parrish (1–0) || Hudson (8–6) || || 28,518 || 2:58 || 40–42 || SportsSouth || WGST/WUBL
|-  style="text-align:center; background:#fbb;"
| 83 || June 29 || @ Blue Jays || 0–1 || Burnett (8–7) || Reyes (3–6) || Ryan (16)|| 30,514 || 2:35 || 40–43 || SportsSouth || WGST/WUBL
|-

|-  style="text-align:center; background:#fbb;"
| 84 || July 1 || Phillies || 3–8 || Kendrick (8–3) || Morton (1–2) || || 29,206 || 3:07 || 40–44 || WPCH || WGST/WUBL
|-  style="text-align:center; background:#fbb;"
| 85 || July 2 || Phillies || 3–7 || Eaton (3–6) || Campillo (3–3) || || 30,138 || 3:14 || 40–45 || FSN South || WGST/WUBL
|-  style="text-align:center; background:#fbb;"
| 86 || July 3 || Phillies || 1–4 || Hamels (9–5) || Jurrjens (8–4) || Gordon (2) || 28,805 || 2:21 || 40–46 || WPCH || WGST/WUBL
|-  style="text-align:center; background:#bfb;"
| 87 || July 4 || Astros || 6–2 || Hudson (9–6) || Moehler (4–4) || || 48,045 || 2:34 || 41–46 || WPCH || WGST/WUBL
|-  style="text-align:center; background:#fbb;"
| 88 || July 5 || Astros || 1–6 || Sampson (4–3) || Reyes (3–7) || || 37,049 || 2:32 || 41–47 || WPCH || WGST/WUBL
|-  style="text-align:center; background:#bfb;"
| 89 || July 6 || Astros || 7–6 (17) || Ring (2–1) || Byrdak (2–1) || || 24,169 || 5:35 || 42–47 || SportsSouth || WGST/WUBL
|-  style="text-align:center; background:#fbb;"
| 90 || July 7 || @ Dodgers || 0–3 || Kuroda (5–6) || Campillo (3–4) || || 39,896 || 2:03 || 42–48 || SportsSouth || WGST/WUBL
|-  style="text-align:center; background:#bfb;"
| 91 || July 8 || @ Dodgers || 9–3 || Jurrjens (9–4) || Billingsley (8–8) || || 39,702 || 3:03 || 43–48 || SportsSouth || WGST/WUBL
|-  style="text-align:center; background:#fbb;"
| 92 || July 9 || @ Dodgers || 1–2 || Lowe (7–8) || Hudson (9–7) || Saito (17) || 39,815 || 2:00 || 43–49 || FSN South || WGST/WUBL
|-  style="text-align:center; background:#fbb;"
| 93 || July 11 || @ Padres || 0–4 || Peavy (7–5) || Reyes (3–8) || Hoffman (17) || 40,232 || 2:29 || 43–50 || SportsSouth || WGST/WUBL
|-  style="text-align:center; background:#bfb;"
| 94 || July 12 || @ Padres || 4–1 || Morton (2–2) || Maddux (3–8) || González (3) || 42,438 || 2:53 || 44–50 || SportsSouth || WGST/WUBL
|-  style="text-align:center; background:#bfb;"
| 95 || July 13 || @ Padres || 12–3 || Campillo (4–4) || Wolf (6–9) || || 31,347 || 2:26 || 45–50 || SportsSouth || WGST/WUBL
|-  style="text-align:center; background:khaki;"
| – || July 15 || colspan="10"|2008 Major League Baseball All-Star Game in New York
|-  style="text-align:center; background:#bfb;"
| 96 || July 18 || Nationals || 7–6 || Hudson (10–7) || Redding (7–4) || González (4) || 39,861 || 2:32 || 46–50 || WPCH || WGST/WUBL
|-  style="text-align:center; background:#fbb;"
| 97 || July 19 || Nationals || 2–8 || Lannan (6–9) || Jurrjens (9–5) || || 43,285 || 2:46 || 46–51  || WPCH || WGST/WUBL
|-  style="text-align:center; background:#fbb;"
| 98 || July 20 || Nationals || 6–15 || Pérez (3–7) || Reyes (3–9) || || 29,320 || 3:25 || 46–52 || SportsSouth || WGST/WUBL
|-  style="text-align:center; background:#bfb;"
| 99 || July 21 || @ Marlins || 4–0 || Campillo (5–4) ||Volstad (2–1) || || 14,155 || 2:24 || 47–52 || SportsSouth || WGST/WUBL
|-  style="text-align:center; background:#fbb;"
| 100 || July 22 || @ Marlins || 0–4 || VandenHurk (1–1) || Morton (2–3) || || 14,721 || 2:33 || 47–53 || SportsSouth || WGST/WUBL
|-  style="text-align:center; background:#bfb;"
| 101 || July 23 || @ Marlins || 9–4 || Hudson (11–7) || Nolasco (10–6) || || 16,068 || 2:52 || 48–53 || FSN South || WGST/WUBL
|-  style="text-align:center; background:#bfb;"
| 102 || July 25 || @ Phillies || 8–2 || Jurrjens (10–5) || Kendrick (8–5) || ||45,114 || 2:50 || 49–53 || WPCH || WGST/WUBL
|-  style="text-align:center; background:#fbb;"
| 103 || July 26 || @ Phillies || 9–10 || Eaton (4–8) || Boyer (2–6) || Lidge (23) || 45,107 || 3:12 || 49–54 || FOX || WGST/WUBL
|-  style="text-align:center; background:#fbb;"
| 104 || July 27 || @ Phillies || 10–12 || Condrey (3–2) || Tavárez (0–3) || Lidge (24) || 45,096 || 3:16 || 49–55 || SportsSouth || WGST/WUBL
|-  style="text-align:center; background:#fbb;"
| 105 || July 28 || Cardinals || 3–12 || Looper (10–8) || Morton (2–4) || || 28,705 || 2:52 || 49–56 || SportsSouth || WGST/WUBL
|-  style="text-align:center; background:#fbb;"
| 106 || July 29 || Cardinals || 3–8 || Franklin (4–4) || Soriano (0–1) || || 29,541 || 3:08 || 49–57 || WPCH || WGST/WUBL
|-  style="text-align:center; background:#fbb;"
| 107 || July 30 || Cardinals || 2–7 || Thompson (4–2) || Jurrjens (10–6) || Villone (1) || 35,257 || 3:18 || 49–58 || FSN South || WGST/WUBL
|-  style="text-align:center; background:#bfb;"
| 108 || July 31 || Cardinals || 9–4 || Bennett (2–4) || Piñeiro (3–5) || || 40,653 || 2:44 || 50–58 || WPCH || WGST/WUBL
|-

|-  style="text-align:center; background:#fbb;"
| 109 || August 1 || Brewers || 0–9 || Suppan (6–7) || James (2–4) || || 32,238 || 2:44 || 50–59 || WPCH || WGST/WUBL
|-  style="text-align:center; background:#fbb;"
| 110 || August 2 || Brewers || 2–4 || Sabathia (11–8) || Morton (2–5) || Torres (21) || 42,096 || 2:32 || 50–60 || FOX || WGST/WUBL
|-  style="text-align:center; background:#bfb;"
| 111 || August 3 || Brewers || 5–0 || Campillo (6–4) || Sheets (10–5) || || 29,177 || 2:34 || 51–60 || SportsSouth || WGST/WUBL
|-  style="text-align:center; background:#fbb;"
| 112 || August 4 || @ Giants || 2–4 || Cain (7–9) || Jurrjens (10–7) || Wilson (31) || 37,473 || 2:40 || 51–61 || SportsSouth || WGST/WUBL
|-  style="text-align:center; background:#bfb;"
| 113 || August 5 || @ Giants || 11–4 || Hampton (1–0) || Sánchez (8–8) || || 36,098 || 2:55 || 52–61 || SportsSouth || WGST/WUBL
|-  style="text-align:center; background:#fbb;"
| 114 || August 6 || @ Giants || 2–3 || Lincecum (12–3) || James (2–5) || Wilson (32) || 39,955 || 2:14 || 52–62 || FSN South || WGST/WUBL
|-  style="text-align:center; background:#bfb;"
| 115 || August 7 || @ D-backs || 6–4 || Morton (3–5) || Petit (1–3) || Gonzalez (5) || 27,798 || 2:49 || 53–62 || SportsSouth || WGST/WUBL
|-  style="text-align:center; background:#bfb;"
| 116 || August 8 || @ D-backs || 11–6 || Campillo (7–4) || Davis (4–7) || Bennett (3) || 27,977 || 3:05 || 54–62 || SportsSouth || WGST/WUBL
|-  style="text-align:center; background:#bfb;"
| 117 || August 9 || @ D-backs || 11–4 || Jurrjens (11–7) || Haren (12–6) || || 36,269 || 3:16 || 55–62 || SportsSouth || WGST/WUBL
|-  style="text-align:center; background:#fbb;"
| 118 || August 10 || @ D-backs || 1–6 || Webb (17–4) || Hampton (1–1) || || 35,862 || 2:29 || 55–63 || SportsSouth || WGST/WUBL
|-  style="text-align:center; background:#bbb;"
| – || August 12 || Cubs || colspan="6"|Rescheduled for August 13|| 55–63 || colspan="2"|
|-  style="text-align:center; background:#fbb;"
| 119 || August 13 || Cubs || 2–10 || Marquis (8–7) || Morton (3–6) || || 27,220 || 3:24 || 55–64 || WPCH || WGST/WUBL
|-  style="text-align:center; background:#fbb;"
| 120 || August 13 || Cubs || 0–8 || Harden (7–2) || Campillo (7–5) || || 33,714 || 2:53 || 55–65 || FSN South || WGST/WUBL
|-  style="text-align:center; background:#fbb;"
| 121 || August 14 || Cubs || 7–11 || Lilly (12–6) || Glavine (2–4) || || 36,365|| 3:10 || 55–66 || FSN South || WGST/WUBL
|-  style="text-align:center; background:#fbb;"
| 122 || August 15 || Giants || 1–5 || Cain (8–9) || Jurrjens (11–8) || || 30,682 || 2:44 || 55–67 || WPCH || WGST/WUBL
|-  style="text-align:center; background:#bfb;"
| 123 || August 16 || Giants || 11–5 || Hampton (2–1) || Palmer (0–1) || || 41,893 || 3:18 || 56–67 || WPCH || WGST/WUBL
|-  style="text-align:center; background:#fbb;"
| 124 || August 17 || Giants || 1–3 || Lincecum (13–3) || Morton (3–7) || Wilson (33) || 30,503 || 3:04 || 56–68 || SportsSouth || WGST/WUBL
|-  style="text-align:center; background:#fbb;"
| 125 || August 18 || Giants || 0–5 || Zito (7–15) || Campillo (7–6) || || 18,113 || 2:33 || 56–69 || SportsSouth || WGST/WUBL
|-  style="text-align:center; background:#fbb;"
| 126 || August 19 || @ Mets || 3–7 || Heilman (3–7) || Bennett (2–5) || || 50,589 || 2:57 || 56–70 || WPCH || WGST/WUBL
|-  style="text-align:center; background:#fbb;"
| 127 || August 20 || @ Mets || 3–6 || Pelfrey (12–8) || Jurrjens (11–9) || || 50,178 || 2:08 || 56–71 || FSN South || WGST/WUBL
|-  style="text-align:center; background:#fbb;"
| 128 || August 21 || @ Mets || 4–5 || Ayala (2–8) || Núñez (0–1) || || 51,952 || 2:58 || 56–72 || WPCH || WGST/WUBL
|-  style="text-align:center; background:#fbb;"
| 129 || August 22 || @ Cardinals || 3–18 || Wainwright (7–3) || Morton (3–8) || Piñeiro (1) || 43,926 || 3:08 || 56–73 || SportsSouth || WGST/WUBL
|-  style="text-align:center; background:#bfb;"
| 130 || August 23 || @ Cardinals || 8–4 || Carlyle (1–0) || McClellan (2–6) || Gonzalez (6) || 44,074 || 3:13 || 57–73 || FOX || WGST/WUBL
|-  style="text-align:center; background:#fbb;"
| 131 || August 24 || @ Cardinals || 3–6 || Looper (12–10) || Reyes (3–10) || Perez (5) || 43,361 || 2:35 || 57–74 || SportsSouth || WGST/WUBL
|-  style="text-align:center; background:#bfb;"
| 132 || August 26 || Marlins || 10–9 || Ohman (4–0) || Gregg (6–7) || || 17,539 || 3:31 || 58–74 || SportsSouth || WGST/WUBL
|-  style="text-align:center; background:#fbb;"
| 133 || August 27 || Marlins || 1–4 || Johnson (4–0) || Hampton (2–2) || || 19,755 || 2:16 || 58–75 || FSN South || WGST/WUBL
|-  style="text-align:center; background:#bfb;"
| 134 || August 28 || Marlins || 4–2 || Morton (4–8) || Sánchez (2–3) || Gonzalez (7) || 20,155 || 2:27 || 59–75 || SportsSouth || WGST/WUBL
|-  style="text-align:center; background:#fbb;"
| 135 || August 29 || @ Nationals || 3–7 || Pérez (6–10) || Campillo (7–7) || Hanrahan (7) || 22,737 || 2:59 || 59–76 || SportsSouth || WGST/WUBL
|-  style="text-align:center; background:#fbb;"
| 136 || August 30 || @ Nationals|| 8–9(10) || Shell (1–1) || Núñez (0–2) || || 30,326 || 3:46 || 59–77 || SportsSouth || WGST/WUBL
|-  style="text-align:center; background:#fbb;"
| 137 || August 31 || @ Nationals || 4–8 || Mock (1–3) || Dessens (0–1) || || 31,090 || 2:48 || 59–78 || SportsSouth || WGST/WUBL
|-

|-  style="text-align:center; background:#fbb;"
| 138 || September 1 || @ Marlins || 3–4 || Lindstrom (3–2) || Gonzalez (0–1) || || 12,209 || 2:44 || 59–79 || SportsSouth || WGST/WUBL
|-  style="text-align:center; background:#bfb;"
| 139 || September 2 || @ Marlins || 16–14 || Julio (1–0) || Lindstrom (3–3) || Gonzalez (8) || 14,092 || 3:44 || 60–79 || SportsSouth || WGST/WUBL
|-  style="text-align:center; background:#fbb;"
| 140 || September 3 || @ Marlins || 3–5 || Waechter (4–2) || Ohman (4–1) || Nelson (1) || 11,211 || 2:48 || 60–80 || FSN South || WGST/WUBL
|-  style="text-align:center; background:#bfb;"
| 141 || September 4 || Nationals || 2–0 || Parr (1–0) || Martis (0–1) || Gonzalez (9) || 18,708 || 2:31 || 61–80 || FSN South || WGST/WUBL
|-  style="text-align:center; background:#bfb;"
| 142 || September 5 || Nationals || 10–5 || Jurrjens (12–9) || Bergmann (2–11) || || 25,064 || 2:55 || 62–80 || WPCH || WGST/WUBL
|-  style="text-align:center; background:#fbb;"
| 143 || September 6 || Nationals || 5–8(10) || Hanrahan (6–3) || Gonzalez (0–2) || Shell (2) || 34,369 || 2:53 || 62–81 || SportsSouth || WGST/WUBL
|-  style="text-align:center; background:#fbb;"
| 144 || September 7 || Nationals || 4–7(14) || Shell (2–1) || Bennett (2–6) || || 30,753 || 4:34 || 62–82 || SportsSouth || WGST/WUBL
|-  style="text-align:center; background:#bfb;"
| 145 || September 9 || Rockies || 5–4(10) || Tavárez (1–3) || Buchholz (6–6) || || 21,821 || 3:10 || 63–82 || WPCH || WGST/WUBL
|-  style="text-align:center; background:#bfb;"
| 146 || September 10 || Rockies || 9–5 || Bennett (3–6) || Vizcaíno (1–1) || || 19,693 || 3:05 || 64–82 || FSN South || WGST/WUBL
|-  style="text-align:center; background:#bfb;"
| 147 || September 11 || Rockies || 8–4 || Jurrjens (13–9) || Rusch (5–5) || || 20,039 || 2:50 || 65–82 || WPCH || WGST/WUBL
|-  style="text-align:center; background:#bbb;"
| – || September 12 || @ Mets || colspan="6"|Rescheduled for September 13|| 65–82 || colspan="2"|
|-  style="text-align:center; background:#bfb;"
| 149 || September 13 || @ Mets || 3–2 || Ridgway (1–0) || Schoeneweis (2–4) || Gonzalez (10) || || || 66–82 || FOX || WGST/WUBL
|-  style="text-align:center; background:#fbb;"
| 148 || September 13 || @ Mets || 0–5 || Niese (1–0) || Reyes (3–11) || || 54,705 || 2:44 || 66–83 || || WGST/WUBL
|-  style="text-align:center; background:#bfb;"
| 150 || September 14 || @ Mets || 7–4 || Julio (2–0) || Ayala (2–9) || Gonzalez (11) || 56,039 || 3:29 || 67–83 || SportsSouth || WGST/WUBL
|-  style="text-align:center; background:#fbb;"
| 151 || September 16 || Phillies || 7–8 || Madson (4–2) || Gonzalez (0–3) || Lidge (37) || 30,319 || 3:41 || 67–84 || SportsSouth || WGST/WUBL
|-  style="text-align:center; background:#fbb;"
| 152 || September 17 || Phillies || 1–6 || Happ (1–0) || Jurrjens (13–10) || || 32,821 || 2:49 || 67–85 || FSN South || WGST/WUBL
|-  style="text-align:center; background:#fbb;"
| 153 || September 18 || Phillies || 3–4 || Hamels (14–9) || Hampton (2–3) || Lidge (38) || 39,070 || 2:42 || 67–86 || WPCH || WGST/WUBL
|-  style="text-align:center; background:#fbb;"
| 154 || September 19 || Mets || 5–9 || Feliciano (3–4) || Tavárez (1–4) || || 42,803 || 3:25 || 67–87 || WPCH || WGST/WUBL
|-  style="text-align:center; background:#bfb;"
| 155 || September 20 || Mets || 4–2 || Campillo (8–7) || Martínez (5–6) || Gonzalez (12) || 50,124 || 2:38 || 68–87 || SportsSouth || WGST/WUBL
|-  style="text-align:center; background:#bfb;"
| 156 || September 21 || Mets || 7–6 || Julio (3–0) || Schoeneweis (2–5) || Gonzalez (13) || 49,222 || 3:20 || 69–87 || SportsSouth || WGST/WUBL
|-  style="text-align:center; background:#fbb;"
| 157 || September 22 || @ Phillies || 2–6 || Eyre (5–0) || Bennett (3–7) || || 36,796 || 2:37 ||69–88 || WPCH || WGST/WUBL
|-  style="text-align:center; background:#bfb;"
| 158 || September 23 || @ Phillies || 3–2 || Hampton (3–3) || Hamels (14–10) || Gonzalez (14) || 39,322 || 2:46 || 70–88 || WPCH || WGST/WUBL
|-  style="text-align:center; background:#bfb;"
| 159 || September 24 || @ Phillies || 10–4 || Carlyle (2–0) || Myers (10–13) || || 41,430 || 3:16 || 71–88 || FSN South || WGST/WUBL
|-  style="text-align:center; background:#fbb;"
| 160 || September 26 || @ Astros || 4–5 || Valverde (6–3) || Tavárez (1–5) || || 33,477 || 2:57 || 71–89 || SportsSouth || WGST/WUBL
|-  style="text-align:center; background:#bfb;"
| 161 || September 27 || @ Astros || 11–5 || Núñez (1–2) || Backe (9–14) || || 37,491 || 2:57 || 72–89 || SportsSouth || WGST/WUBL
|-  style="text-align:center; background:#fbb;"
| 162 || September 28 || @ Astros || 1–3 || Rodríguez (10–7) || Hampton (3–5) || Valverde (45) || 37,113 || 2:19 || 72–90 || SportsSouth || WGST/WUBL
|-

Player stats

Batting
Note: G = Games played; AB = At Bats; R = Runs scored; H = Hits; 2B = Doubles; 3B = Triples; HR = Home runs; RBI = Runs batted in; AVG = Batting average; SB = Stolen bases

Pitching
Note: W = Wins; L = Losses; ERA = Earned run average; G = Games pitched; GS = Games started; SV = Saves; IP = Innings pitched; R = Runs allowed; ER = Earned runs allowed; BB = Walks allowed; K = Strikeouts  

Source:2008 Atlanta Braves at Baseball Reference

Farm system

LEAGUE CHAMPIONS: Mississippi

References

Atlanta Braves seasons
Atlanta Braves season
Atlanta